In the 1892 Quebec general election on March 8, 1892, to elect members of the Legislative Assembly of the Province of Quebec, Canada. The incumbent Quebec Conservative Party, led by Charles-Eugène Boucher de Boucherville, defeated the Quebec Liberal Party, led by Félix-Gabriel Marchand.

Mercier had been accused of corruption and removed from office as Premier by Quebec Lieutenant-governor Auguste-Réal Angers on December 16, 1891.  The scandal probably influenced the outcome of the election.  Mercier gave up the post of Liberal leader (and leader of the Opposition) to Félix-Gabriel Marchand, and was later acquitted of all charges.

Boucher de Boucherville resigned a year later, and was replaced by Louis-Olivier Taillon as Conservative leader and premier. Taillon in turn resigned in 1896, and was replaced by Edmund James Flynn.  Flynn lost the 1897 election, and the Conservatives never held power in Quebec again.

Results

See also
 List of Quebec premiers
 Politics of Quebec
 Timeline of Quebec history
 List of Quebec political parties
 8th Legislative Assembly of Quebec

Quebec general election
Elections in Quebec
General election
Quebec general election